The Edison Award is an annual Dutch music prize awarded for outstanding achievements in the music industry. It is comparable to the American Grammy Award. The Edison award itself is a bronze replica of a statuette of Thomas Edison, designed by the Dutch sculptor Pieter d'Hont. It is one of the oldest music awards in the world, first presented in 1960 at the inaugural Grand Gala du Disque.

Edisons
In 1960, the Committee for Collective Gramophone Campaigns organized the Edison awards for recordings in various categories. The first Edisons – named after the inventor of the phonograph, Thomas Edison – were awarded at the inaugural Grand Gala du Disque, a showcase for the awards featuring national and international performers. 
Coincidentally, Edison was of Dutch lineage.
Each year, Edisons were awarded at two separate events, the Grand Gala du Disque Classique for classical music and the Grand Gala du Disque Populaire for popular music. There were two main categories: International artists and domestic (Dutch) artists, in various musical styles such as pop, vocal, jazz, instrumental, children and (in the early years) a separate award for French-language music. The winners were decided by judges. 

The 1963 Grand Gala du Disque Populaire, which overran by almost two hours, saw Marlene Dietrich, Sarah Vaughan and Charles Aznavour accepting an Edison. In 1965, the winners included Esther Ofarim, Oliver Nelson, Louis van Dijke, the Beatles and Joan Baez. Pianist Vladimir Horowitz and composer-conductor Igor Stravinsky won awards at the Grand Gala du Disque Classique.The award itself has also gone through many changes. In the 1960s and early 1970s, it grew to a (then) record number of 24 categories in 1969. In later years, the number of awards was inconsistent and several categories did not last longer than a couple of years. From 1974 to 1976 no Edisons were awarded and in 1977 only Dutch artists were awarded a prize. In 1980, the Classical and Popular were jointly awarded. While the award lost much of its prestige in the 1980s due to lack of media coverage and interest from record companies – the number of categories continued to grow to a record number of 35 in 1991. The choices became more progressive, as several award winners were virtually unknown to the general public. In 1991, for instance, no awards were given to best-selling and critically lauded albums, but instead lesser known artists like The Riverdogs, Michael Lee Firkins, rapper Paris and instrumentalist Jean Marc Zelwer got the prizes.

By the end of the 1990s, the Edison experienced another overhaul, as the prize was split into the Edison Pop and Edison Jazz/World awards (there had always been a separate Edison Classical Award ceremony). It also began to focus more on Dutch artists and a number of new categories were introduced, such as best album, video, single and newcomer. Each year also featured one or two awards which were directly voted for by the television audiences.

Interest in the Edison has gone up in recent years, although no awards were given in 2006 and 2007. These days, the award is focused on Dutch product only, with several categories such as best male artist, female artist, newcomer, and theatre/vocal artist. There is also an annual lifetime achievement award for an artist with a distinguished career. The 2011 ceremony, held on 2 October and which featured eight categories, was not televised.

Award winners 
From 1960 to 2011, over 750 Edison awards were handed out. The list of artists with most Edison wins is dominated by Dutch artists with relatively young careers. This is mainly because from the late 1990s, it has become much easier to win multiple awards in one year, which in the early days of the award was virtually impossible.
 Marco Borsato – 13 wins, from 1995 to 2011, including a lifetime achievement award in 2011 and five wins in the Best male artist category.
 Anouk – 9 wins, from 1998 to 2011, including three Edisons in her debut year (1998) and five awards in the Best female artist category.
 Herman van Veen – 8 wins, from 1970 to 2010, including a lifetime achievement award in 2010, two awards in the children's category and four in the Best male vocal category.
 BLØF – 7 wins, from 2000 to 2009, including five awards for Best group.
 Ilse DeLange – 6 wins, from 1999 to 2011, including four times as Best female artist.

Most wins for international artists
 Quincy Jones – 5 wins, from 1964 to 1979, in the jazz/instrumental and musical/film categories.
 Elvis Costello – 4 wins, from 1978 to 1999.
 Cliff Richard – 4 wins, from 1962 to 1998 (lifetime achievement award).
 Barbra Streisand – 4 wins, from 1964 to 1992.

Miles Davis, Beach Boys, Charles Aznavour, Emmylou Harris, Eric Clapton, Bob James, Paul Simon, Phil Collins, Ry Cooder, Stevie Wonder, U2 and Robbie Williams all had three Edison wins each. (Miles Davis and the Beach Boys were awarded an additional fourth Edison in 1966, but these were later scrapped as the list of winners had been leaked to the press prematurely and no awards were given that year).

Edison Pop Oeuvreprijs

 1998 Boudewijn de Groot
 1998 Cliff Richard
 1999 Toto
 1999 Golden Earring
 2000 André Hazes
 2000 Status Quo
 2001 BZN
 2002 Simple Minds
 2002 Rob de Nijs
 2003 René Froger
 2003 Mark Knopfler
 2004 Frank Boeijen
 2004 George Michael
 2005 Phil Collins
 2005 De Dijk
 2006 Normaal
 2009 Krezip
 2010 Herman van Veen
 2010 Rowwen Hèze
 2011 Marco Borsato
 2014 Youp van 't Hek
 2014 BLØF
 2016 Tiësto
 2017 Anouk
 2018 Extince
 2019 Ilse DeLange
 2020 Willeke Alberti

Edison Jazz/World Oeuvreprijs

 2006 Rita Reys
 2007 Randy Crawford & Joe Sample
 2008 Piet Noordijk
 2008 Al Jarreau
 2009 Dianne Reeves
 2010 Chaka Khan
 2011 Ivan Lins
 2012 Dee Dee Bridgewater
 2013 Marcus Miller
 2014 Kurt Elling
 2014 Greetje Kauffeld
 2015 Malando Orkest
 2015 Flairck
 2016 Metropole Orkest
 2017 Lee Towers
 2017 Joshua Redman
 2018 Patti Austin
 2018 Angélique Kidjo
 2019 Carel Kraayenhof
 2019 Eliane Elias
 2020 Eric Vloeimans
 2020 Louis van Dijk

Edison Classical Music Awards
The Edison Classical Music Awards are a collection of awards annually given to the best classical music recordings of the year. Awards are separately given in eleven categories. The award, part of the Edison Award, is issued from Amsterdam, the Netherlands.

Oeuvreprijs

 2003 Anne Sofie von Otter
 2004 Mstislav Rostropovich
 2005 Thomas Hampson
 2006 Jessye Norman
 2007  John Williams
 2008 Kiri Te Kanawa
 2009 Beaux Arts Trio
 2010 Pierre Boulez
 2011 Daniel Barenboim
 2012 Frans Brüggen
 2013 Reinbert de Leeuw
 2014 Netherlands Radio Philharmonic Orchestra
 2015 Itzhak Perlman
 2016 Bernard Haitink
 2017 Ton Koopman
 2018 Renée Fleming
 2019 Kronos Quartet
 2020 Roberta Alexander

2003
 Oeuvreprijs (lifetime achievement award): Anne Sofie von Otter
 Opera: Giuseppe Verdi , Bryn Terfel, Thomas Hampson, Daniil Shtoda, and others, Berlin Philharmonic, conducted by Claudio Abbado
 Baroque music: Jean-Baptiste Lully ,  conducted by William Christie
 Contemporary music: Luciano Berio , Kim Kashkashian, Vienna Radio Symphony Orchestra conducted by Dennis Russell Davies
  (special historical art): Joseph Haydn, Frédéric Chopin and others, Richter reDiscovered, Carnegie Hall recital Svjatoslav Richter BMG
 Concerts: Pyotr Ilyich Tchaikovsky and others, Violin Concertos Vadim Repin, Kirov Orchestra conducted by Valery Gergiev
 Solo recitals: Johann Sebastian Bach and others, Maxim Vengerov plays Bach, Rodion Shchedrin, Eugène Ysaÿe
 Chamber music: Ludwig van Beethoven Complete Violin Sonatas,  Augustin Dumay, Maria João Pires
 Choir music: Igor Stravinsky, Lili Boulanger, Symphony of Psalms and others;  Monteverdi Choir, London Symphony Orchestra conducted by John Eliot Gardiner
 Orchestral music: Mahler Symphony No. 5, Berlin Philharmonic conducted by Simon Rattle
 Vocal (solo): Vincenzo Bellini, Rossini and others, Bel Canto Renée Fleming, Orchestra of St. Luke's conducted by P. Summers
 Middle Ages and Renaissance (early music): Jan Pieterszoon Sweelinck The Complete keyboard works, Muziek Groep Nederland/Radio Wereldomroep Nederland
 Edison Nescafé Public award: Carel Kraayenhof, Tango Royal

2016
Oeuvreprijs: Bernard Haitink
Opera: René Jacobs, Mozart's Die Entführung aus dem Serail
Instrumental soloist: Daniil Trifonov (Rachmaninov – Variations) – Universal Music, DG
Vocal soloist: Sabine Devieilhe (Mozart – The Weber Sisters) – Warner Classics, Erato
Debut: Lucas Debargue (Scarlatti / Chopin / Liszt / etc. – Lucas Debargue) – Sony Classical
Chamber music: Quatuor Ébène (Schubert – String Quintet / Lieder) – Warner Music, Erato
Orchestral music: Concentus Musicus Wien, Nikolaus Harnoncourt (Beethoven – Symphonies 4 & 5) – Sony Classical
Choir music: Ensemble Pygmalion conducted by Raphaël Pichon (Wagner / Brahms / Schumann – Rheinmädchen) – [PIAS] The Netherlands, Harmonia Mundi
De ontdekking [The discovery]: Barbara Hannigan, Bavarian Radio Symphony Orchestra conducted by Andris Nelsons (Abrahamsen – Let Me Tell You) – [PIAS] Holland Harmony Mundi, Winter & Winter

References

External links
 
 Edison Klassiek [Classical] homepage

Dutch music awards
Awards established in 1960